Ezequiel Matías Schelotto (born 23 May 1989) is an Argentine-Italian footballer who plays for Aldosivi in the Primera Nacional, second division from Argentina. A versatile player on the right flank, he started his career as a winger and was later converted into a full-back.

Born in Argentina of Italian descent, Schelotto moved to Italy in 2008 to play for Cesena. He chose to represent Italy at international level, earning a full cap for the national side in 2012 while an Atalanta player. In 2013, he joined Internazionale and spent the next two years on loan at several Serie A sides, before making a move to Sporting CP in Portugal, and then to Brighton & Hove Albion in England. Following a brief loan spell at Chievo in 2019, he was released from his contract with Brighton, after which he agreed to a return to Argentina with Racing in early 2021. Despite his contract only running out in December 2023, Racing Club allowed Schelotto to leave on a free transfer to Aldosivi in the summer of 2022.

He is nicknamed El Galgo ("The Greyhound" in Spanish) due to his running skills and, less frequently, El Mosquetero ("The Musketeer").

Club career

Club Banfield 
Schelotto began his football adventure in his native country, Argentina, specifically in the minor divisions of Club Banfield. But he did not debut in the first team as he emigrated to European football.

Cesena
Schelotto joined Lega Pro Prima Divisione side Cesena in July 2008. Then, in April 2009, his transfer was finally cleared by FIFA. During that season, following his approved transfer, Schelotto played six matches out of a possible seven for Cesena, scoring one goal and helping Cesena to promotion back up to the second tier Serie B.

Atalanta

Cesena (loan)
In June 2009, Schelotto was signed by Serie A side Atalanta on a co-ownership deal for €250,000 and, in July 2009, he was instantly loaned back to his previous club, Cesena. During the 2009–10 Serie B campaign, Schelotto made 40 league appearances for the side, scoring six goals. Of his 40 matches, 33 of them were from the starting XI. He earned just €82,750 in 2009–10 season.

On 24 June 2010, Schelotto was signed outright by Atalanta for an additional €2.5 million fee, which were just relegated to the Serie B following an 18th-place finish during the 2009–10 Serie A, whilst Cesena earned their second consecutive promotion as the club earned promotion to the top flight following a top three Serie B finish. Following his purchase, the player was again loaned back to the Emilia-Romagna-based club, along with veteran midfielder Fabio Caserta and central defender Maximiliano Pellegrino. Schelotto wage was also increased significantly. As he left the club in January 2011, he earned €268,333.31 from Cesena for the first 7 months of 2010–11 season.

Schelotto had a bitter Serie A season with Cesena, one in which the team started brightly, even topping the league table by round three, but then endured a landslide that saw the team drop to 18th place and into the relegation places by November. He lost his starting place on 24 October as the coach used Luis Jiménez as a new supportive striker in the three forward formation. Since then, he only made four starts to replace Giuseppe Colucci (who was injured) and Stephen Appiah (twice), respectively, as one of the midfielders. His last start – and last match – with Cesena was on 23 January 2011, a match where Cesena fielded an inferior squad against Milan where the three forwards, Schelotto, Igor Budan, and Dominique Malonga, were not regular starters.

During the first half of the 2010–11 campaign, Schelotto made 17 league appearances with one goal. On 31 January 2011, he was transferred to Serie A side Catania on loan.

Catania (loan)
On 31 January 2011, Schelotto transferred to Catania in Sicily, on loan from Atalanta. In his transfer deal, Catania were sold the option to sign the player on a co-ownership basis at the conclusion of the current campaign. Schelotto started his first match for the Sicilians on 6 February 2011, a match that Catania lost 1–0 away to Bologna, in part due to an early red card to defender Pablo Álvarez.

Return to Atalanta
Schelotto returned to Atalanta on 1 July 2011. He was included in the first team squad of Atalanta for 2011–12 Serie A campaign, which the club was promoted back to the top tier as the champions of Serie B in May 2011. During his  seasons with the Serie A club, he earned a transfer to F.C. Internazionale Milano for €6 million transfer fee in January 2013, despite in a cash-plus-player deal.

Internazionale
Schelotto joined Italian giants Internazionale on 31 January 2013 for €3.5 million cash plus 50% "card" of Marko Livaja (Inter valued 50% rights of Livaja for €2.5 million but bought the rights back from Cesena for €1.5 million cash). Schelotto made his debut on 3 February in a 3–1 loss against Siena, playing the first 45 minutes before giving way to Mateo Kovačić. He scored his only goal for the club in the 1–1 draw against city rivals Milan on 24 February 2013.

Schelotto spent two seasons on loan to other Italian clubs from 2013 to 2014 season to 2014–15 season; on 31 August 2015, it was agreed between the two parties Schelotto would terminate his contract by a mutual consent.

Sassuolo (loan)
On 29 August 2013, Schelotto signed on loan with Serie A side Sassuolo. On 29 September he scored his first league goal for Sassuolo in a 2–2 draw with Lazio.

Parma (loan)
On 22 January 2014, Schelotto joined Parma along with his Sassuolo compatriot, Jonathan Rossini, signing on a loan deal.

Chievo (loan)
On 25 August 2014, Schelotto joined Chievo on a seasons long loan.

Sporting CP
On 20 November 2015, Schelotto joined Portuguese side Sporting Clube de Portugal on a three-and-a-half year contract, after being released by Internazionale in the summer of that year.

Brighton & Hove Albion

2017–18

On 31 August 2017, Schelotto completed a transfer to Premier League club Brighton & Hove Albion, signing a three-year contract at the south coast club. Schelotto made his Albion debut on 1 October 2017 coming on as a substitute in the 2–0 away defeat to Arsenal in the league. In his next game for the Sussex club he came on again as a substitute this time away to West Ham where Brighton won 3–0. Schelotto made his home debut for The Seagulls on 20 November coming on as a sub in a 2–2 draw against Stoke City. Schelotto made his first start for Brighton in an away match in the league against Spurs where they lost 2–0 on 13 December.

2018–19: Loan to Chievo

After not making any appearances for Brighton in the first half of the 2018–19 season, Schelotto signed on loan to Chievo Verona – for the second time in his career – for the rest of the season on 28 January 2019. His first appearance of this loan spell came as a 72nd minute substitute on 8 February in a 3–0 home loss against Roma. He made 4 appearances for the Veronese side where they were relegated from Serie A for the first time in 12 years.

2019–20: Back to Brighton

On 26 October 2019, after almost 18 months without making an appearance for The Seagulls Schelotto came on as a substitute in a home tie against Everton in which Brighton won 3–2. He came on again as a sub a week later in Brighton's next match at home to Norwich in a 2–0 victory. After making 9 appearances in all competitions at the end of the 2019–20 season Schelotto was released by Brighton, making a total of 32 appearances across his spell at the Sussex club.

Racing Club
On 4 February 2021, Schelotto made a return to Argentina and joined Racing Club on a two-and-a-half-year deal.

Aldosivi
On 2 August 2022, Schelotto joined Club Atlético Aldosivi on a free transfer from Racing Club on a one-and-a-half-year deal that runs until December 2023. His contract with Racing Club was initially due to expire only in December 2023, however, a mutual agreement was reached between all 3 parties - Racing Club, Aldosivi, and Schelotto, for the termination of his contract with Racing Club to allow him to join Aldosivi more than a year before the expiration of his contract.

International career
Thanks to his Italian ancestry, Schelotto was eligible for Italian citizenship. In November 2009, he was called up to the Italian national under-21 team, and was immediately featured in the starting lineup in a game against Hungary on 13 November.

Since making his debut, he played all available 2011 UEFA European Under-21 Football Championship qualification matches, and unusually as right back in the last qualification match against Wales in September. In that match, Italy beat Wales 1–0 and narrowly topped Wales as the group winner. He assisted Stefano Okaka to score the second goal in the first leg of the playoff round against Belarus, but missed the second leg due to suspension. Italy were eventually eliminated due to a 0–3 loss against Belarus in Borisov.

On 10 August 2012, he was called up by Cesare Prandelli to the Italian senior team for a friendly against England, where he made his debut in the 2–1 defeat.

Personal life
Born in Buenos Aires, Schelotto also holds an Italian passport due to his Italian descent from Cogoleto (GE), in Liguria, where his great-great-grandfather Giovanni Battista Francesco Schelotto emigrated from in the late 19th century. He is the fifth of seven children – including 5 males – two of whom are also footballers.

Career statistics

Club

International

Honours
Cesena
Lega Pro Prima Divisione: 2008–09
Serie B runner up: 2009–10

References

External links
Profile at AIC.Football.it 
Profile at Cesena 

1989 births
Living people
Footballers from Buenos Aires
Argentine people of Italian descent
Argentine people of Ligurian descent
Italian people of Argentine descent
Citizens of Italy through descent
Argentine footballers
Italian footballers
Association football midfielders
Association football defenders
Italy international footballers
Italy under-21 international footballers
A.C. Cesena players
Atalanta B.C. players
Catania S.S.D. players
Inter Milan players
U.S. Sassuolo Calcio players
Parma Calcio 1913 players
A.C. ChievoVerona players
Sporting CP footballers
Brighton & Hove Albion F.C. players
Racing Club de Avellaneda footballers
Aldosivi footballers
Serie A players
Serie B players
Serie C players
Primeira Liga players
Premier League players
Argentine expatriate footballers
Italian expatriate footballers
Expatriate footballers in Portugal
Argentine expatriate sportspeople in Portugal
Italian expatriate sportspeople in Portugal
Expatriate footballers in England
Argentine expatriate sportspeople in England
Italian expatriate sportspeople in England